The 1958 United States Senate election in Wyoming took place November 4, 1958. Incumbent Republican Senator Frank A. Barrett ran for re-election to his second term. He was challenged by Gale W. McGee, a University of Wyoming professor and the Democratic nominee. Despite the state's strong Republican lean, McGee ran an energetic campaign against Barrett, earning the support of the national Democratic establishment. McGee ultimately narrowly upset Barrett, winning 51% of the vote to Barrett's 49%.

Democratic primary

Candidates
 Gale W. McGee, University of Wyoming professor, former aide to Senator Joseph C. O'Mahoney
 Hepburn T. Armstrong, businessman

Results

Republican Primary

Candidates
 Frank A. Barrett, incumbent Governor of Wyoming

Results

General election

Results

References

United States Senate elections in Wyoming
Wyoming
United States Senate